"Brightdown" is a single from the Nami Tamaki album Don't Stay. Brightdown was used as the 2nd opening theme to the anime D.Gray Man.

CD track listing 
"Brightdown"
"Color of Your Tears"
"Endless Dream"
"Brightdown" -Instrumental-

Limited Edition DVD track listing 
"Brightdown" Video Clip

References
 玉置 成実 | RELEASE. Retrieved April 23, 2010.

2007 singles
Nami Tamaki songs
2007 songs
Sony Music Entertainment Japan singles